Sallent is a locality located in the municipality of Pinell de Solsonès, in Province of Lleida province, Catalonia, Spain. As of 2020, it has a population of 25.

Geography 
Sallent is located 95km east-northeast of Lleida.

References

Populated places in the Province of Lleida